Mysterious Crossing is a 1936 American film. It was directed by Arthur Lubin.

Production
It was originally called Murder on the Mississippi, which was the title of the Fred MacIsaac story on which it was based. Universal bought this in June 1936 as a vehicle for Boris Karloff. Filming started October 1936.

Reception
The New York Times said the film "may not be great art" but "it has a smoothness about it."

References

External links
 
Mysterious Crossing at Letterbox DVD
Mysterious Crossing at BFI
Mysterious Crossing at Variety

1936 films
1936 mystery films
Films directed by Arthur Lubin
American mystery films
American black-and-white films
1930s English-language films
1930s American films